Sidalcea diploscypha is a species of flowering plant in the mallow family known by the common name fringed checkerbloom. It is endemic to California, where it grows in the woodlands and valleys of the central part of the state.

Description
Sidalcea diploscypha is an annual herb growing up to 40 to 60 centimeters tall with a hairy to bristly stem. The leaves have blades deeply divided into narrow, forking lobes covered in bristly hairs.

The inflorescence is a crowded panicle of several flowers. The flower has five pink petals, each with a slight fringe on the tip and sometimes with dark coloration at the base. The petals can be up to 3.5 centimeters long.

References

External links
Calflora Database:  Sidalcea diploscypha (Fringed checker mallow,  Fringed checkerbloom, Fringed sidalcea)
Jepson Manual eFlora (TJM2) treatment of  Sidalcea diploscypha
USDA Plants Profile for Sidalcea diploscypha
UC CalPhotos gallery: Sidalcea diploscypha

diploscypha
Endemic flora of California
Natural history of the California chaparral and woodlands
Flora of the Sierra Nevada (United States)
Natural history of the California Coast Ranges
Natural history of the Central Valley (California)
Natural history of the San Francisco Bay Area
Flora without expected TNC conservation status